Krasnoslobodsk (Oš) is a town and the administrative center of Krasnoslobodsky District of the Republic of Mordovia, Russia, located on the left bank of the Moksha River (a tributary of the Oka),  west of Saransk, the capital of the republic. As of the 2010 Census, its population was 10,151.

History
It has been known since 1571; town status was granted to it in 1780.

Administrative and municipal status
Within the framework of administrative divisions, Krasnoslobodsk serves as the administrative center of Krasnoslobodsky District. As an administrative division, it is incorporated within Krasnoslobodsky District as the town of district significance of Krasnoslobodsk. As a municipal division, the town of district significance of Krasnoslobodsk is incorporated within Krasnoslobodsky Municipal District as Krasnoslobodskoye Urban Settlement.

References

Notes

Sources

Cities and towns in Mordovia
Krasnoslobodsky Uyezd
Krasnoslobodsky District